Alksnupiai is a hamlet in Kėdainiai district municipality, in Kaunas County, in central Lithuania. According to the 2011 census, the hamlet was uninhabited. It is located 1 km from Miegėnai, by the Viešnautas river.

Demography

References

Villages in Kaunas County
Kėdainiai District Municipality